WKCV-LP (103.5 FM) is a radio station licensed to La Plume, Pennsylvania, United States, and serving the Keystone College area. The station is currently owned by Keystone College.

References

External links
 
 

KCV-LP
KCV-LP
KCV-LP
Radio stations established in 2005
2005 establishments in Pennsylvania
Keystone College